David Whyte (born 2 November 1955) is an Anglo-Irish poet. He has said that all of his poetry and philosophy are based on "the conversational nature of reality". His book The Heart Aroused: Poetry and the Preservation of the Soul in Corporate America (1994) topped the best-seller charts in the United States.

Life and work
Whyte's mother was from Waterford, Ireland, and his father was a Yorkshireman. He attributes his poetic interest to both the songs and the poetry of his mother's Irish heritage and to the landscape of West Yorkshire. He grew up in West Yorkshire and has commented that he had "a Wordsworthian childhood", in the fields and woods and on the moors. Whyte has a degree in marine zoology from Bangor University.

During his twenties, Whyte worked as a naturalist and lived in the Galápagos Islands, where he experienced a near drowning on the southern shore of Hood Island. He led anthropological and natural history expeditions in the Andes, the Amazon and the Himalayas.

Whyte moved to the United States in 1981 and began a career as a poet and speaker in 1986. From 1987, he began taking his poetry and philosophy to larger audiences, including consulting and lecturing on organisational leadership models in the US and UK exploring the role of creativity in business. He has worked with companies such as Boeing, AT&T, NASA, Toyota, The Royal Air Force and the Arthur Andersen accountancy group.

Work and vocation, and "Conversational Leadership" are the subjects of several of Whyte's prose books, including Crossing the Unknown Sea: Work as Pilgrimage of Identity, The Three Marriages: Reimagining Work, Self and Relationship and The Heart Aroused: Poetry and the Preservation of The Soul in Corporate America which topped the business best seller lists, selling 155,000 copies.

Whyte has written ten volumes of poetry and four books of prose. Pilgrim is based on the human need to travel, "From here to there." The House of Belonging looks at the same human need for home. He describes his collection Everything Is Waiting For You (2003) as arising from the grief at the loss of his mother.  Pilgrim was published in May 2012. His latest book is Consolations: The Solace, Nourishment and Underlying Meaning of Everyday Words, an attempt to 'rehabilitate' many everyday words we often use only in pejorative or unimaginative ways. He has also written for newspapers, including The Huffington Post and The Observer. He leads group poetry and walking journeys regularly in Ireland, England and Italy.  

Whyte has an honorary degree from Neumann College, Pennsylvania, and from Royal Roads University, British Columbia, and is Associate Fellow of both Templeton College, Oxford, and the Saïd Business School, Oxford.

Whyte has spent a portion of every year for the last twenty five years in County Clare, Ireland. Over the years and over a number of volumes of poetry he has built a cycle of poems that evoke many of the ancient pilgrimage sites of The Burren mountains of North Clare and of Connemara. 

Whyte runs the "Many Rivers" organisation and "Invitas: The Institute for Conversational Leadership", which he founded in 2014. He has lived in Seattle and on Whidbey Island and currently lives in the US Pacific North West; he holds US, British and Irish citizenship. He is married to Gayle Karen Young, former Chief Talent and Culture Officer of the Wikimedia Foundation. He has a son, Brendan, from his first marriage to Autumn Preble and a daughter, Charlotte, from his second marriage to Leslie Cotter. Whyte has practised Zen and was a regular rock climber. He was a close friend of the Irish poet John O'Donohue.

Works

Poetry collections
 David Whyte : Essentials Langley, Washington : Many Rivers Press, 2018. , 
 The Bell and the Blackbird Langley, Washington : Many Rivers Press, 2018. , 
The Sea in You Langley, Washington : Many Rivers Press, 2016. , 
Pilgrim Langley, WA : Many Rivers Press, 2012. , 
River Flow: New & Selected Poems Revised Edition Langley, WA : Many Rivers Press, 2012. , 
River Flow: New & Selected Poems Langley, Wash. : Many Rivers Press, 2007. , 
Everything is Waiting for You (Many Rivers Press, 2003)
The House of Belonging (Many Rivers Press, 1996)
Fire in the Earth (Many Rivers Press, 1992)
Where Many Rivers Meet (Many Rivers Press, 1990)
Songs for Coming Home (Many Rivers Press, 1984)

Prose
Consolations: The Solace, Nourishment and Underlying Meaning of Everyday Words Langley, WA : Many Rivers Press, 2014. , 
The Three Marriages: Reimagining Work, Self & Relationship New York : Riverhead Books, 2010. , 
Crossing the Unknown Sea: Work as A Pilgrimage of Identity London : Penguin, 2002. , 
The Heart Aroused: Poetry & the Preservation of the Soul in Corporate America 	London : Industrial Society, 1997. ,

Audiobooks
Pilgrim
Sometimes
Return
What to remember when waking
Echoes in the well
Sweet darkness
Clear mind wild heart
Midlife and the great unknown
Thresholds
The poetry of self compassion
Life at the frontier
A change for the better
The teacher's vocation
Make a friend of the unknown
The opening of eyes
Faithful to all things
The power and place of poetry
Footsteps: A writing life
Solace: The Art of Asking the Beautiful Question"

References

Further reading
 Poet David Whyte's Questions That Have No Right to Go Away, O, The Oprah Magazine''

External links
 David Whyte official website, Many Rivers
 Whyte profile in the Financial Times
 
 "The Conversational Nature of Reality", video. 5 mins
 Interview with David Whyte, from Sounds True publishing

English people of Irish descent
People from Island County, Washington
1955 births
English expatriates in the United States
Living people
People from Mirfield
Alumni of Bangor University
English non-fiction writers
Audiobook narrators
English male poets
English male non-fiction writers